Ololygon littoralis is a species of frog in the family Hylidae.
It is endemic to Brazil.
Its natural habitats are subtropical or tropical moist lowland forests and intermittent freshwater marshes.
It is threatened by habitat loss.

References

littoralis
Endemic fauna of Brazil
Amphibians described in 1991
Taxonomy articles created by Polbot